Sabrina is a 300-pound bronze statue owned by Amherst College. Since it was donated to the College in 1857, the statue has been the subject of numerous pranks and has changed hands between the college administration and various student groups many times. Traditionally, members of even-year and odd-year classes have battled for possession of the statue.

History

Early history 

In 1857, Amherst College accepted a gift from Joel Hayden, future Lieutenant Governor of Massachusetts—a bronze neoclassical sculpture by William Calder Marshall of Sabrina listening to her invocation from John Milton's Comus (1634). The statue was originally installed on the town side of the Amherst campus, between North Dormitory and the Octagon.

It was not long before the scantily-clad Sabrina attracted the attention of the then all-male Amherst students. Around 1860, an industrious Amherst student, in the first of many Sabrina-inspired pranks, stole a set of undergarments from one of the nearby female colleges and used them to clothe Sabrina. The college administration harshly reprimanded the student. The next morning, Sabrina appeared with a dent in her cheek, apparently inflicted by a blow from an axe.

This first incident of chicanery inspired a series of other pranks. Between 1870 and 1880 students painted the statue several times, typically alternating between white and black. The class of 1877 stole Sabrina and kept her for nearly a week before returning her. In 1878 she was transported to the roof of the Octagon building, where she was found holding a doll emblazoned "'81." The class of 1882 stole the statue to make her the guest of honor at a class banquet, a theme that was to become a recurring pattern in Sabrina pranks. The class of 1883 threw the statue down the college well, from which the administration had considerable difficulty extracting her.

These early pranks typically pitted students against the college administration, making Sabrina an object of some controversy. In 1884, the statue was nearly destroyed when President Julius Hawley Seelye, frustrated with the pranks the statue inspired, ordered a college groundskeeper to destroy her. The groundskeeper, however, was too moved by the statue's beauty to carry out the orders and instead hid her underneath a haystack in his barn. The statue was recovered on June 19, 1887, when members of the class of 1890, motivated by rumors that the statue had not been destroyed, snuck into the barn at night, found the statue, and carted her off in a wheelbarrow.

Tradition of interclass rivalry 
The tradition of odd- and even-year class members competing for possession of the statue began in earnest in 1891. The sophomore class 1893 brought Sabrina out of hiding to attend their class banquet and kept her stored safely in Boston. Yet when members of the class of 1894 caught wind of plans to bring her back to campus, one of them traveled to Springfield to intercept the package, impersonating the statue's owners and convincing the clerk to send her back to Boston under his own care. This trickery resulted in a warrant being issued for the student's arrest, at which point he boarded a steamer for Europe to wait "for the excitement to die out."

 The statue remained under the control of even-year classes through 1910, when senior Max Shoop compiled and published a brief history of the pranks involving the statue. Sabrina remained a topic of significant interest at the college and beyond, generating an article in The New York Times about the statue's history in 1910, and another book on her history in 1921, as well as a brief New York Times notice about her appearance at a baseball game in 1922. Particularly notable was an appearance in 1919 that resulting in "a car chase, gun fire and a car accident that left a number of students injured."

In 1934 the statue was returned to the college, where she was installed in the memorabilia room. She was subject to many failed attempts at theft (including by students from Amherst's rival Williams College) and several acts of vandalism, including a decapitation in 1941. (Her head was welded back in place shortly thereafter.) The administration attempted to discourage further thefts by falsely claiming that the statue had been filled with concrete and welded to its base.

She remained in place until 1951, when members of the graduating class, suspecting the statue was in fact hollow, used a torch to detach Sabrina from her base and steal her again. This theft and the later appearance of the statue flying over a college baseball game the following fall generated an article in Life magazine article about the tradition in 1952.

The class of 1951 subsequently returned the statue to the college, where she remained for over 20 years, until students staged a high-profile heist in 1977. In June 1977 the statue was displayed at the 25th reunion of the class of 1952 in order to raise donations for the college. The class required that the statue be placed on display, however, so she was mounted behind plexiglass in Converse Hall. In the early hours of October 13, three masked students entered the hall, tied up the switchboard operator, and pried the statue loose. At the last minute the students enlisted Prince Albert Grimaldi (then a student at the college) so they could claim diplomatic immunity if necessary. They were apprehended less than a month later, when campus police, having learned of their plan to fly the statue over a football game, staked out the local airports.

The statue became the subject of some controversy after the college became coed, as some argued that the statue's tradition was inconsistent with the desire to become a more diverse, progressive institution.

The statue was stolen again in 1984 by Bruce Becker (class of 1980) and Rosanne Haggerty (class of 1982) and made two more flights over Amherst athletic events. The statue was returned to the college by Bruce Angiolillo (class of 1974) in 1994 for the inauguration of Tom Gerety as president of the college. She remained securely kept by the college, occasionally displayed for alumni events, for well over a decade.

Theft of 2008 

The tradition was renewed in 2008, when several members of the graduating class stole the statue from its secure location on campus. Despite rumors that the statue was locked in the college's military bunker, one of the students had seen the statue returned to the basement of a college dormitory after the reunion festivities of 2007. In late April 2008, the students staged a fake poker game in the basement of the dormitory; while two kept a lookout at the building's entrances, a third picked the lock to the basement storage room, and a fourth student backed a getaway car up to the dorm's loading dock. The heist was completed in under 20 minutes, and the statue was promptly transported to Vassar College, where it was left in the dorm room of a student's girlfriend.

On May 7, 2008, an email was sent to many members of the class of 2008 soliciting their involvement in an elaborate senior prank. The students used a private Facebook account to organize efforts and share photos and information.

The graduating class answered the call admirably. On May 9 posters and decorations were put up and festivities were held across campus, including a live rendition of "The Sabrina Song" and a giant poster in the dining quad. During the college's "Senior Night" celebrations that evening, President Anthony Marx gave the following speech, with campus police officers standing beside him.

Restoration and current status 
The statue was kept in hiding for five years. During that period, her guardians had her carefully restored by the Polich Tallix art foundry in New Windsor, New York. Over the years the statue's hand had been broken off, her foot was sheared off at the ankle, and her head remained only precariously attached by brackets. The students contacted Bruce Becker, who had stolen Sabrina in 1984 and had since procured a mold of the statue. The foundry used that mold to reconstruct the statue's hand and foot, which were then reattached. The statue's cracked neck was reinforced with fiberglass and epoxy. The guardians also commissioned a wheeled base for Sabrina to aid in her transportation and display.

The statue was returned to the college in 2013, during five-year reunion of the class of 2008, where, in homage to the tradition's early days, she was displayed at the class banquet for student photos. At the end of the evening, the class returned the statue to the college. After less than two hours, Sabrina was stolen from the college police station by the ten-year reunion class of 2003. It remained in their possession for less than an hour, when the class of 2014 tricked the 2003s into helping carry her off the dance floor and into a getaway car. Sabrinas whereabouts are currently unknown.

Sabrina's Song

References

External links 
 Sabrina photo collection, published by Archives & Special Collections of Amherst College.

Amherst College
Bronze sculptures in Massachusetts
Statues in Massachusetts
1857 establishments in Massachusetts
1857 sculptures
Sculptures of women in Massachusetts
Vandalized works of art in Massachusetts
Stolen works of art
Recovered works of art